St Clement's Church is one of three Grade I listed churches in Bournemouth; along with St Stephen's and St Peter's. The church stands on St Clements Road in Boscombe and is recorded by Historic England as being in poor condition.

History 
The church was built between 1871 and 1873 and was the first major church designed by J. D. Sedding.

The church became listed on 5 May 1952.

The church was restored in 2016.

In recent years the church has been reported as being scene to a number of incidents of anti-social behaviour order; including drug dealing and indecent exposure.

References 

Church of England church buildings in Dorset
Churches in Bournemouth
Grade I listed churches in Dorset
Churches completed in 1873
Arts and Crafts architecture in England
19th-century Church of England church buildings
1873 establishments in England